Nicholas Gerald Chia Yeck Joo (born 8 April 1938) DD, STL was the third Roman Catholic Archbishop of Singapore and the first Singapore-born clergyman to hold the office. He officially retired as Archbishop of Singapore on 18 May 2013, and is succeeded by Archbishop William Goh. He was educated at both Montfort Junior and Secondary schools.

Archbishop Chia received his Episcopal Consecration on 7 October 2001 at the Singapore Indoor Stadium. His consecration was attended by the President of the Republic of Singapore, Mr S. R. Nathan, state dignitaries, sixteen bishops, one hundred and ninety priests and an estimated 11,000 Roman Catholics, together with representatives of the major religions in Singapore. His Principal Consecrator was Archbishop Adriano Bernardini, and the Principal Co-Consecrators were Archbishops Gregory Yong Sooi Ngean and Anthony Soter Fernandez.

The Cathedral of the Good Shepherd was formerly the seat of Archbishop Chia before retiring and the cathedral church of the Roman Catholic Archdiocese of Singapore.

Biodata
(1938) Born on 8 April, the third son in a family of six children.
(1955–1957) Studied in St Francis Xavier Minor Seminary, Singapore.
(1958–1963) Studied in College General (Major Seminary), Penang, Malaysia.
(1964) Ordained priest at the Cathedral of the Good Shepherd, Singapore on 26 January.
(1964–1966) Assistant priest, Church of Saints Peter and Paul, Singapore.
(1966–1967) Studied Mandarin in Kuala Lumpur, Malaysia.
(1967–1969) Assistant priest, Church of Our Lady of Perpetual Succour, Singapore.
(1969–1971) Obtained licentiate in moral theology from the Gregorian University, Rome.
(1972) Did comparative studies on religions in Rome.
(1973–1977) Lecturer and Procurator at College General (Major Seminary), Penang, Malaysia.
(1978–1990) Director of the Singapore Pastoral Institute.
(1980–2001) Parish priest, Church of the Holy Cross, Singapore.
(1983–1996) External lecturer at the St Francis Xavier Minor Seminary, Singapore.
(1990–2001) Chaplain to Catholic students in the National University of Singapore.
(1995–2001) Chancellor and Procurator of the Archdiocese of Singapore.
(2001–2013) Archbishop of Singapore.
(2013–) Archbishop Emeritus of Singapore
(19 February 2014) Suffered a fall the day before, resulting in intracranial haemorrhage and a moderate coma. In intensive care at Mount Alvernia as of 19 February 2014.
(7 April 2018) Celebration held for the occasion of Archbishop Emeritus Chia's 80th birthday.

Coat of arms

The coat of arms of Archbishop Chia consists of a shield upon an archiepiscopal cross surmounted by a green galero with 10 gold fiocchi (tassels) suspended on each side. These are standard ecclesiastical heraldic devices indicating the coat of arms is that of an archbishop.

The flame and dove on the left half of the shield represents the Holy Spirit. The open book on the right half depicts the Word of God. The fish and wavy blue lines represent Singapore and the Archdiocese. The coat of arms also include Archbishop's motto Omnia Omnibus, which is Latin for all things to all men (1 Corinthians 9:22).

The coat of arms was designed by a team from the Catholic Audio-Visual Centre, Singapore.

Appointment as Archbishop
Prior to his appointment as Archbishop, Archbishop Chia was the Parish Priest to the Church of the Holy Cross. When Archbishop Gregory Yong retired, Pope John Paul II appointed Archbishop Chia to the office, other candidates for the office were current Vicar General Monsignor Eugene Vaz and then Rector of St Francis Xavier Major Seminary, Fr. Anthony Ho who has since retired. (No attribution)

Archbishop Chia reached the retirement age of 75 in 2013 and submitted his resignation to the Holy See. His resignation was accepted by Pope Benedict XVI at Noon (Rome Time), 18 May 2013, 18:00 SGT. He is succeeded by Archbishop William Goh.

In February 2014, the Archbishop Emeritus sustained head injuries in a bad fall and was in a coma for more than a month. As he did not recover fully from his injuries, he continues to be cared for in one of Singapore's Catholic nursing homes.

See also
Archdiocese of Singapore
Cathedral of the Good Shepherd
Archbishop Gregory Yong Sooi Ngean

Notes

References
Eugene Wijeysingha (2006), Going Forth... – The Catholic Church in Singapore 1819–2004, Titular Roman Catholic Archbishop of Singapore, 
Episcopal Ordination of Reverend Father Nicholas Chia Souvenir Magazine
Archbishop Nicholas Chia Souvenir Publication, Church of the Holy Cross

External links

Catholic-Hierarchy.org
Official Website of the Archdiocese of Singapore

1938 births
Living people
Singaporean people of Hokkien descent
21st-century Roman Catholic archbishops in Singapore
Roman Catholic archbishops of Singapore
Singaporean Roman Catholic archbishops